Balakhnin is a Russian masculine surname, its feminine counterpart is Balakhnina. It may refer to

 Aleksandr Balakhnin (born 1955), Soviet and Russian footballer and coach
 Sergei Balakhnin (born 1959), Soviet and Russian footballer and coach, brother of Aleksandr

Russian-language surnames